Orodes II of Elymais, also known as Kamnaskires-Orodes, was the ruler of Elymais in the late 1st-century. He was the son and successor of Orodes I, and was himself succeeded by a certain Phraates.

References

Sources 
 
 

1st-century Iranian people
Arsacid dynasty of Elymais
Year of death unknown
Year of birth unknown
Vassal rulers of the Parthian Empire